The TI-86 is a programmable graphing calculator introduced in 1996 which was produced by Texas Instruments. The TI-86 uses the Zilog Z80 microprocessor. It is partially backwards-compatible with its predecessor, the TI-85.

In addition to having a larger screen than the TI-83, the TI-86 also allows the user to type in lower case and Greek letters and features five softkeys, which improve menu navigation and can be programmed by the user for quick access to common operations such as decimal-to-fraction conversion. The calculator also handles vectors, matrices and complex numbers better than the TI-83. One drawback, however, is that the statistics package on the TI-83 range doesn't come preloaded on the TI-86. However, it can be downloaded from the Texas Instruments program archive and installed on the calculator using the link cable.

The TI-86 has been discontinued.

Specifications
CPU: Zilog Z80 6 MHz
RAM: 128 KB, 96 KB user-accessible
ROM: 256 KB non-upgradable
Display: 128×64 pixels high-contrast monochrome LCD
Data Communication: Serial link port; allows two TI-86 calculators to be connected to each other, or one TI-86 to be connected to a PC, for data transfer via a special link cable
Programming Languages: TI-BASIC, Z80 Assembly language (ASM)
Power: 4×AAA, 1×CR1616 or CR1620 (for backup power)

See also
 Comparison of Texas Instruments graphing calculators

References

External links
Official Texas Instruments TI-86 page (Internet Archive)
ticalc.org hosts a large collection of downloadable freeware programs for the TI-86 can be found at along with programming tutorials and hardware extensions
CalcG.org - Very organized and large archive of games and programs.
The Guide - the largest set of tutorials for TI-86 assembly programming
Texas Instruments Program Archive (archived)
Complete Disassembly of a TI-86

Graphing calculators
Texas Instruments programmable calculators
Products introduced in 1997
Z80